Zvi Wiener is a Professor of Finance and the former dean of the Hebrew University Business School Business administration at the Hebrew University of Jerusalem.

Biography

Wiener has Ph.D. in mathematics from the Weizmann Institute of Science in Rehovot (1994). He completed postdoc at the Wharton Business School of the University of Pennsylvania and then joined the Fixed Income division of Lehman Brothers in New York City. Since 1996 Wiener joined the Hebrew University faculty.
 
Wiener is the former Head of the Finance Department and the academic manager of the Executive MBA program specializing in Finance and Banking at the Hebrew University.

Wiener is one of the founders of the Professional Risk Managers' International Association (PRMIA) and serves as a director of PRMIA in Israel. He also served as a consultant for many institutions like Pension funds, Ministry of Finance, the Bank of Israel, Israel Securities Authority and the Tel Aviv Stock Exchange. Wiener also served at the Bank of Israel foreign reserves investment committee.

Wiener provides lobbying services to Bank Hapoalim, and also holds a private company, named Optimize Risk Management Ltd. According to an investigation by The Marker magazine, Wiener's private activities violate the directives of the Supervisor of Wages and Labor Agreements since he serves at the same time as Dean at the Hebrew University and founded by the Israeli government. According to Wiener these activities are in line with regulations. However, the Council for Higher Education did not confirm his claim and instruct the Hebrew University to examine Wiener's employment exception. The Enforcement Branch at the Office of the Supervisor of Wages and Labor Agreements also initiated an examination of that exception. It was also reported that Wiener has promoted a private entrepreneur's appointment at the Hebrew University immediately before the last contributed a large amount of money to the School of Business Administration at the Hebrew University.

Wiener won the Rothschild Fellowship for young scholars of outstanding academic merit and the Alon fellowship for young excellent Scientists. He also won the Teva prize named after Dan Suesskind for research on Dividend policy.

Research

His areas of expertise are Financial modeling, Risk Management, Options and other derivatives with Applications to Corporate finance, Structured product, Stochastic process, Monte Carlo Simulation and Game Theory.

Research of Wiener was published in academic journals including Journal of Finance
, Review of Financial Studies, Journal of Banking and Finance, Journal of Derivatives, Journal of Game Theory, Journal of Money Credit and Banking, Journal of Corporate Finance and many others.

Selected published works

 Kremer, I., Wiener Z., & Winter, E. (2016), Flow Auctions, International Journal of Game Theory.
 Cserna, B., Levy, A. & Wiener, Z. (2013), Counterparty Risk in Exchange-Traded Notes (ETNs), Journal of Fixed Income, 23(1), 76-101.
 Levy, H. & Wiener, Z. (2013), Prospect Theory and Utility Theory: Temporary versus Permanent Attitude Toward Risk, Journal of Economics and Business 68, 1-23.
 Galai D. & Wiener, Z. (2012), Credit Risk Spreads in Local and Foreign Currencies, Journal of Money, Credit and Banking, 44(5), 883-901.
 Goldstein M., Irvine, P., Kandel, E. & Wiener, Z. (2009), Brokerage Commissions and Institutional Trading Patterns, The Review of Financial Studies, 22(12),  5175-5212.
 Galai D. & Wiener, Z. (2008), Stakeholders and the Composition of the Voting Rights of the Board of Directors, Journal of Corporate Finance, 14(2), 107-117.
 Cvitanic J., Wiener, Z. & Zapatero, F. (2008), Analytic Pricing of Executive Stock Options, The Review of Financial Studies, 21(2), 683-724.
 Galai D., Raviv, A. & Wiener, Z. (2007), Liquidation Triggers and The Valuation of Equity and Debt, Journal of Banking and Finance, 36(12), 3604-3620.
 Leippold M. & Wiener, Z. (2004), Efficient Calibration of Trinomial Trees for One-Factor Short Rate Models, Review of Derivatives Research 7, 213-239.
 O'Neill B., Samet, D., Wiener, Z. & Winter, E. (2004), Bargaining with an Agenda, Games and Economic Behavior 48, 139-153.
 Galai D. & Wiener, Z. (2003), Government Support of Investment Projects in the Private Sector A Micro-Economic Approach, Financial Management, 32(3), 33-50.
 Benninga S., Bjork, T. & Wiener, Z. (2002), On the Use of Numeraires in Option Pricing, Journal of Derivatives, 10(2), 43-58.
 Bergman Y., Grundy, B. & Wiener, Z. (1996), Generalized Theory of Rational Option Pricing, The Journal of Finance 51(5), 1573-1610.

Wiener research in articles
 Binomial options pricing model
 Ho–Lee model
 Short-rate model
 Black–Karasinski model
 Value at risk

References

External links
Wiener official website
Professor Wiener at the Hebrew university website
Professor Wiener at Milken Innovation Center website
Professor Wiener at PRMIA website
Simon Benninga and Zvi Wiener (1998). Binomial Term Structure Models, Mathematica in Education and Research, Vol. 7 No. 3 1998
Simon Benninga and Zvi Wiener (2003). Efficient Calibration of Trinomial Trees for One-Factor Short Rate Models
Wiener, Zvi. (2002). Duration, Hebrew University of Jerusalem
Markus Leippold and Zvi Wiener Valuation and Hedging of Interest Rates Derivatives with the Ho-Lee Model, Wharton School 
Innovation News by Maariv
ח"כ כבל על ועדת פישמן: "גם עניין אלוביץ' יגיע לפתחנו", באתר גלובס

Academic staff of the Hebrew University of Jerusalem
Israeli economists
Living people
Wharton School of the University of Pennsylvania alumni
Weizmann Institute of Science alumni
Year of birth missing (living people)